The Vancouver Riptide was a semi-professional ultimate team that competed in American Ultimate Disc League which started play in the 2013 season. They played their home games at Swangard Stadium, in Burnaby, British Columbia. The team ended play at the end of 2017 season, and are moving to Portland, Oregon for the 2020 season due to a lack of attendance and sponsorship.

Sources

Sport in Burnaby
Ultimate (sport) teams
2013 establishments in British Columbia
Ultimate teams established in 2013
Ultimate teams disestablished in 2017
2017 disestablishments in British Columbia